Cody Cropper (born February 16, 1993) is an American professional soccer player  who plays as a goalkeeper for Orange County SC.

Youth soccer 
Born in Atlanta, Cropper moved to Maple Grove, Minnesota when he was 10. He played with the Minnesota Thunder Academy and the Reading Rage, as well spending time with the US U-17 residency program at the IMG Soccer Academy in Bradenton, Florida.

Club career
Cropper had several trials in England, including with Wolverhampton Wanderers and Leicester City, before joining the Ipswich Town academy in 2010. He made the bench for the Ipswich first team, but suffered a torn meniscus. He failed to receive a new contract offer from Ipswich and was released after the 2011–12 season.

Southampton 
Cropper joined Southampton in August 2012. Cropper served as a backup keeper for the Saints; making the first team bench, but playing for the U-21 and U-23 teams and never making a first team appearance. His time with Southampton included multiple injuries. After three years at the south coast club, Cropper was released in May 2015.

Milton Keynes Dons
On June 30, 2015, Cropper joined newly promoted Championship side Milton Keynes Dons. He made his debut for MK Dons on August 11, 2015, in an EFL Cup first round win against Leyton Orient. In September Cropper underwent knee surgery that kept him sidelined for over a month. On April 16, 2016, Cropper was sent off for a foul on Preston North End's striker Eoin Doyle. He returned from the suspension on April 23 and suffered a season ending shoulder injury in a 4–1 loss to Brentford.  Cropper was released after the 2015-16 season when the club decided not to take up the one-year option in Cropper's contract after being relegated to League One.

New England Revolution
On August 18, 2016, Cropper signed with Major League Soccer club New England Revolution.  He made his Revolution debut on October 23, getting a clean sheet in a 3–0 win over the Montreal Impact in the final game of the season.

The Revolution's first choice goalkeeper, Bobby Shuttleworth, was traded to Minnesota United ahead of the 2017 season, giving Cropper a shot at the starting job. Cropper impressed head coach Jay Heaps and won the starting job coming out of preseason. He started 28 of the 34 league games during the year, keeping eight clean sheets.  However the Revolution finished in 7th place in the Eastern Conference, missing out on the playoffs by five points.

Cropper did not play during the 2018 season.  He missed the start of the season due to a concussion. When he had returned to action, head coach Brad Friedel kept Matt Turner as the starter with Brad Knighton as the second choice keeper.

Cropper made his first appearance of 2019 on March 30, a 2–1 win over Minnesota United in the 5th game of the season.  He would start the next 7 games for the Revs before Friedel decided to bench him. Bruce Arena came in as the new head coach, but Cropper failed to return to the lineup.

Hartford Athletic (loan)
On August 17, 2019, Cropper was loaned to USL Championship side Hartford Athletic for the remainder of the season. He made his debut for Hartford on August 24, a 3–2 win over Atlanta United 2. Cropper started the final nine games of the season for Hartford, keeping one clean sheet.

On November 21, 2019, New England declined their contract option on Cropper.

Houston Dynamo
On January 24, 2020, Cropper signed with MLS club Houston Dynamo. He did not make any appearances for the Dynamo in 2020, serving as the backup for Marko Marić. His contract option was declined by Houston following their 2020 season.

FC Cincinnati
On December 30, 2020, it was announced that Cropper had signed for FC Cincinnati ahead of their 2021 season. On August 27, 2021, Cropper was loaned to USL Championship side Memphis 901. He was waived by Cincinnati on September 15, 2021.

Vancouver Whitecaps 
On March 15, 2022, Cropper was signed as a free agent by the Vancouver Whitecaps FC. He was signed for the 2022 season with a club option for 2023.

Orange County SC 
On March 14, 2023, Cropper signed with USL Championship side Orange County SC.

International career
Cropper represented the United States at the 2011 and 2013 editions of the CONCACAF U-20 Championship, the latter of which the US finished as runners-up. He was also the first-choice goalkeeper for the United States at the 2013 FIFA U-20 World Cup and the 2015 Toulon Tournament, the latter of which the US finished in third place.

Cropper has appeared for the US up to U-23 level, including at the 2016 CONCACAF-CONMEBOL Olympic playoff. He received his first United States senior team call-up for an August 14, 2013, friendly against Bosnia and Herzegovina. He was an unrostered player at the USMNT training camp at Stanford University before the 2014 FIFA World Cup, and later received a senior call-up for a friendly against the Czech Republic on September 3, 2014. He was also called up to the United States senior squad for a friendly against Germany on June 10, 2015.

Honours

Club 
Vancouver Whitecaps
 Canadian Championship: 2022

Career statistics

Personal life
Cropper has an English father. He was born in Atlanta and moved to Maple Grove, Minnesota at the age of 10.

References

External links

1993 births
Living people
American soccer players
American expatriate soccer players
Association football goalkeepers
Ipswich Town F.C. players
Southampton F.C. players
Milton Keynes Dons F.C. players
New England Revolution players
Hartford Athletic players
Houston Dynamo FC players
FC Cincinnati players
Memphis 901 FC players
Vancouver Whitecaps FC players
Orange County SC players
United States men's under-20 international soccer players
United States men's under-23 international soccer players
Expatriate footballers in England
Soccer players from Georgia (U.S. state)
Soccer players from Minnesota
English Football League players
Major League Soccer players
USL Championship players
American people of English descent
Whitecaps FC 2 players
MLS Next Pro players